St. Frederick High School is a private, Catholic high school in Monroe, Louisiana. The school was established in 1964 by the Daughters of the Cross and named in honor of Rae Frederick Rinehart Jr., whose family donated the land the school is located on.

Today, St. Frederick is a college prep school serving grades 7–12.

Athletics
St. Frederick High athletics competes in the LHSAA.

Notable alumni
Chase Coleman, actor

Notable faculty
Roger Carr, former professional football player, football coach from 2003 to 2005

Notes and references

External links
 School Website

Catholic secondary schools in Louisiana
Buildings and structures in Monroe, Louisiana
Educational institutions established in 1964
Schools in Ouachita Parish, Louisiana
Private middle schools in Louisiana
1964 establishments in Louisiana